Southern Boroughs was an electoral district for the Legislative Assembly in the Australian state of New South Wales created in 1856. It included the towns of Goulburn, Braidwood, Yass and Queanbeyan, while the surrounding rural area were in the electoral districts of  Argyle, United Counties of Murray and St Vincent and King and Georgiana. It was replaced by Goulburn, Braidwood, Queanbeyan and Yass in 1859.

Members

Election results

1856

1858

References

Southern Boroughs
1856 establishments in Australia
1859 disestablishments in Australia